Austrorhytida capillacea is a species of air-breathing land snail found in Australia.

References

 Iredale, T. (1943). Guide to the land shells of New South Wales, part 5. Australian Naturalist. 11: 61-69.
 Mclauchlan, C. F. (1954). Three new land shells from New South Wales. Australian Zoologist. 12: 39.

External links
 Pfeiffer, L. (1849). Nachträge zu L. Pfeiffer Monographia Heliceorum. Zeitschrift für Malakozoologie. Cassel (Theodor Fischer). 6 (4): 66-79 
 Gould, A. A. (1852). Mollusca and shells. In: United States Exploring Expedition during the years 1838, 1839, 1840, 1841, 1842 under the command of Charles Wilkes. Boston. 12: 1-510; atlas 1856: 1-16

Rhytididae
Gastropods described in 1832
Molluscs of Australia